Sunburst and Snowblind is an EP by Scottish alternative rock band Cocteau Twins. It was released on 18 November 1983 through the label 4AD. The EP features  "Sugar Hiccup" from the album Head over Heels, as well as three other tracks. The title is taken from the first line in the opening track of Head Over Heels, "When Mama Was Moth".

"From the Flagstones" and "Hitherto" were later included on the 1986 compilation album The Pink Opaque, and the entire EP was included on in 1991's The Box Set. All songs except "Because of Whirl-Jack" have been performed live. Unlike many Cocteau Twins songs, "Sugar Hiccup" and "From the Flagstones" have discernible English lyrics.

The EP was later reissued as an appendage to the CD version of Head Over Heels in the United Kingdom, Brazil and Canada.

Track listing

Personnel 
 Elizabeth Fraser – vocals
 Robin Guthrie – instruments, production

Production
 John Fryer – production on tracks 2 and 4

Charts

References 

Cocteau Twins albums
1983 EPs